The 2004 Washington State Cougars football team represented Washington State University as a member of the Pacific-10 Conference during the 2004 NCAA Division I-A football season. Led by second-year head coach Bill Doba, the Cougars compiled an overall record of 5–6 with a mark of 3–5 in conference play, placing seventh in the Pac-10. Washington State played home games at Martin Stadium in Pullman, Washington.

Schedule

Season summary

Washington

Source: ESPN

References

Washington State
Washington State Cougars football seasons
Washington State Cougars football